Socha is a town and municipality in Colombia. Socha may also refer to
Socha, Łódź Voivodeship, a village in Poland
Chomętów-Socha, a village in Poland
Socha (surname)
Socha Na Tha, a 2005 Hindi-language film
Ek Safar Aisa Kabhi Socha Na Tha, a Hindi-language television series on Indian channel Sony TV